Godziszów may refer to:

 Godziszów, Lublin Voivodeship, a village in Janów Lubelski County, Lublin Voivodeship, in eastern Poland
 Godziszów, Silesian Voivodeship, a village in Gmina Goleszów, Cieszyn County, Silesian Voivodeship, southern Poland